Abra Cadaver is a crime novel by the American writer James N. Tucker set in 1990s Pittsburgh, Pennsylvania.

It tells the story of Dr. Jack Merlin, full-time surgeon, part-time magician, and now sleuth, who discovers the body of an old classmate in the gross anatomy lab at the University of Pittsburgh Medical Center.

Sources
Contemporary Authors Online. The Gale Group, 2006. PEN (Permanent Entry Number): 0000142340.

External links
 Pittsburgh Post-Gazette book review

1999 American novels
American crime novels
Novels set in Pittsburgh
University of Pittsburgh
Signet Books books